Aeschynanthus speciosus, also known as the basket plant, is a species of flowering plant in the family Gesneriaceae. There are many species of Aeschynanthus, all of which have long, trailing stems and bright flowers. Most of the time they are shaded in different colors, from orange–yellow in the lower area to orange–red at the tip with a blotched red inside and a yellow streaked throat.

It is particularly suitable for hanging baskets. It requires bright light but not direct sunlight, does best in humid conditions, and should be potted in a porous, acidic medium.

References

speciosus
Plants described in 1847
Taxa named by William Jackson Hooker